The 2019 season is Buriram United's 8th season in the Thai League. The club enters the season as the Thai League defending champions, and will participate in the top level league. They will also participate in two domestic cups (FA and League Cup), Champions Cup and AFC Champions League.

This is the first season in the league that Buriram will face only other 15 instead of 17 teams since the football association reduced the top league teams from 18 to 16. And this is also the first season that Buriram doesn't win any titles of the season (excluding Thailand Champions Cup) since the club's first season, 2010.

Club information

Squad information

Transfers

In

Note 1: Go Seul-ki returned from loan before heading to Port FC for another loan.

Out

Friendly matches

Competitions

Overview

Champions Cup

Thai League

League table

Results summary

Results by matchday

Matches

FA Cup

League Cup

AFC Champions League

Group stage

Statistics

Appearances
Players with no appearances are not included in the list. The italic text means the player left the club during the season.

Goalscorers
Includes all competitive matches. The list is sorted by shirt number when total goals are equal. The italic text means the player left the club during the season.

Clean sheets

References

External links
 Buriram United official website
 Thai League website

Bur
2019